Hinterrhein can refer to:

 Hinterrhein (river), a tributary of the Rhine
 Hinterrhein, Switzerland, a municipality
 Hinterrhein (district), the district including that Swiss municipality